Scottish Canals is the Scottish Government body responsible for managing the country's inland waterways. Formerly a division of British Waterways, it became a stand-alone executive non-departmental public body of the Scottish Government on 2 July 2012. Legally, the corporation is still referred to as the British Waterways Board, but in all other aspects it uses the brand Scottish Canals.

The body is responsible for five canals.

Caledonian – 
Crinan – 
Forth and Clyde – 
Monkland (no longer operational, although two watered sections remain) – 
Union Canal –

History

British Waterways was founded in 1962 under the Transport Act, taking over statutory responsibility for operating and maintaining waterways across Great Britain. In 2010 the UK Government determined that responsibility for inland waterways in England and Wales should pass to a new charitable trust, the Canal & River Trust. However, the Scottish Government decided that canals in Scotland would remain publicly owned and British Waterways would continue to operate in Scotland as a statutory corporation trading as Scottish Canals.

References

External links

 
 
 
2012 establishments in Scotland
Companies based in Glasgow
British companies established in 2012
Government agencies established in 2012
Executive non-departmental public bodies of the Scottish Government